Relative to Poison is a 1947 detective novel by E.C.R. Lorac, the pen name of the British writer Edith Caroline Rivett. It is the twenty ninth in her long-running series featuring Chief Inspector MacDonald of Scotland Yard, one of the detectives of the Golden Age of Detective Fiction who relies on standard police procedure to solve his cases.

Synopsis
A recently demobbed ATS girl is offered employment in a Regent Street café, and takes her friend along. Before long they find themselves embroiled in a case of murder

References

Bibliography
 Cooper, John & Pike, B.A. Artists in Crime: An Illustrated Survey of Crime Fiction First Edition Dustwrappers, 1920-1970. Scolar Press, 1995.
 Hubin, Allen J. Crime Fiction, 1749-1980: A Comprehensive Bibliography. Garland Publishing, 1984.
 Nichols, Victoria & Thompson, Susan. Silk Stalkings: More Women Write of Murder. Scarecrow Press, 1998.
 Reilly, John M. Twentieth Century Crime & Mystery Writers. Springer, 2015.

1947 British novels
British mystery novels
Novels by E.C.R. Lorac
Novels set in London
British detective novels
Collins Crime Club books